The following is a list of colleges and universities in the U.S. state of  Georgia. Many of these schools have multiple campuses. In such cases, only the location of the main campus in Georgia is specified. Most public institutions and traditional private institutions in Georgia are accredited by the Southern Association of Colleges and Schools. The flagship university of the state of Georgia is the University of Georgia.

Public institutions

University System of Georgia (USG)

The University System of Georgia (USG) is the organizational body that includes 26 public institutions of higher learning in the U.S. state of Georgia. All public schools are partially supported by the state legislature. All students attending public colleges or universities in Georgia are eligible for the HOPE Scholarship providing qualifications are met.

Technical College System of Georgia (TCSG) 

The Technical College System of Georgia (TCSG), formerly known as the Department of Technical and Adult Education (DTAE), is the body which supervises the U.S. state of Georgia's 22 technical colleges.

 Albany Technical College, Albany
 Athens Technical College, Athens
 Atlanta Technical College, Atlanta
 Augusta Technical College, Augusta
 Central Georgia Technical College, Macon
 Chattahoochee Technical College, Marietta
 Coastal Pines Technical College, Waycross
 Columbus Technical College, Columbus
 Georgia Northwestern Technical College, Rome
 Georgia Piedmont Technical College, Clarkston
 Gwinnett Technical College, Lawrenceville
 Lanier Technical College, Oakwood
 North Georgia Technical College, Clarkesville
 Oconee Fall Line Technical College, Sandersville
 Ogeechee Technical College, Statesboro
 Savannah Technical College, Savannah
 South Georgia Technical College, Americus
 Southeastern Technical College, Vidalia
 Southern Crescent Technical College, Griffin
 Southern Regional Technical College, Thomasville
 West Georgia Technical College, Waco
 Wiregrass Georgia Technical College, Valdosta

Independent public institutions
Any institutes listed here are operated by the state of Georgia but do not fall under the governance of the University System of Georgia or the Technical College System of Georgia.
Georgia Military College, Milledgeville

Private colleges and universities

Large and medium-size private colleges and universities

Small non-profit private colleges and universities

Atlanta University Center
The Atlanta University Center is a consortium of historically black private colleges located on neighboring campuses near downtown Atlanta.  Though each school is administered independently, students are offered a unified learning experience through cross-registration of courses.  Current members are listed below.
 Clark Atlanta University
 Morehouse College – Men's college
 Morehouse School of Medicine
 Spelman College – Women's college

Liberal arts

 Agnes Scott College, Decatur – women's college – affiliated with Presbyterian Church (USA)
 Berry College, Mount Berry – Christian school
 Brewton–Parker College, Mount Vernon – affiliated with Georgia Baptist Convention
 Covenant College, Lookout Mountain – Christian school – affiliated with Presbyterian Church in America
 Emmanuel College, Franklin Springs – affiliated with International Pentecostal Holiness Church
 Morris Brown College, Atlanta
 Oglethorpe University, Brookhaven
 Piedmont University, Demorest – affiliated with the National Association of Congregational Christian Churches and the United Church of Christ
 Reinhardt University, Waleska – affiliated with United Methodist Church
 Shorter University, Rome – affiliated with Georgia Baptist Convention
 Wesleyan College, Macon – women's college – affiliated with United Methodist Church
 Young Harris College, Young Harris – affiliated with United Methodist Church

Others

 Andersonville Theological Seminary, Camilla
 Andrew College, Cuthbert – affiliated with United Methodist Church
 Art Institute of Atlanta, Atlanta
 Atlanta's John Marshall Law School, Atlanta
 Brenau University, Gainesville
 Christian College of Georgia, Atlanta – affiliated with Christian Church (Disciples of Christ)
 Columbia College of Missouri, Fort Stewart and Hunter Army Airfield
 Columbia Theological Seminary, Decatur – affiliated with Presbyterian Church (USA)
 Evangeline Booth College, Atlanta – theological school affiliated with The Salvation Army
 Georgia Central University, Atlanta – Christian school affiliated with Korean American Presbyterian Church
 Herzing University, Atlanta
 Interdenominational Theological Center, Atlanta
 LaGrange College, LaGrange
 Life University, Marietta
 Luther Rice College & Seminary, Lithonia 
 Paine College, Augusta – historically black school
 Philadelphia College of Osteopathic Medicine (Georgia Campus), Suwanee – pharmacy school
 Point University, West Point – affiliated with Christian churches and churches of Christ
 Thomas University, Thomasville
 Toccoa Falls College, Toccoa – affiliated with Christian and Missionary Alliance
 Truett McConnell University, Cleveland – affiliated with Georgia Baptist Convention

Small for-profit schools
For-profit institutions are those that are operated by private, profit-seeking businesses.

 Argosy University, Sandy Springs
 Ashworth College, Norcross
 Beulah Heights University
 Bauder College
 Gwinnett College, Lilburn
 Gwinnett College – Sandy Springs, Sandy Springs
 Interactive College of Technology
 Portfolio Center
 University of Phoenix, Atlanta

Academics and reputation

Public and private schools ranked by academic measures

The institutions below are ranked by average SAT score of first-time freshman for the 2012-2013 academic year. A first-time freshman describes a student entering a 4-year college or university for the first time. First-time freshman account for the majority of the student population at a 4-year college or university. These figures do not include transfer, dual enrolled, post-baccalaureate or non-traditional students.

(NOTE: The reported values for public schools are as reported by the USG's annual report, minor variations may exist when comparing to other college search publications such as College Board)

The average number of AP/IB/Dual Enrollment courses taken by a 2014 accepted freshman at Georgia Tech was 8.5
The average number of AP/IB/Dual Enrollment courses taken by a 2042 accepted freshman at University of Georgia was 7
 SAT Subject tests are considered at this institution.
 Statistics do not include students that enrolled at Southern Polytechnic State University prior to those institutions' merger.

USG research universities ranked by endowment and research expenditure
Two out of four USG research universities are ranked among the top 25 research universities in the nation. The University of Georgia and Georgia Institute of Technology are consistently ranked in the top percentile of research institutions. Both schools are considered to be Public Ivies, a designation reserved for top public universities in the United States.

 Emory University hosts 14 GRA eminent scholars. Emory is a private school and not a part of the state-supported University System of Georgia. Emory is home to 3 GRA VentureLab companies and a fourth in collaboration with Georgia Institute of Technology. Emory is a member of 8 Centers for Research Excellence. Emory usually partners with a USG research university in forming Centers of Research Excellence.
 Augusta University values do not reflect the combined numbers from the 2013 Augusta State University merger.

Academic achievement among Georgia colleges and universities

Rank by Rhodes Scholars
52 Rhodes Scholars came from a Georgia college or university. The most Rhodes Scholars came from the University of Georgia and Emory University.

Rank by Marshall Scholars
The University of Georgia and Georgia Institute of Technology rank among top 10 public universities receiving Marshall scholars. Since 2001, Georgia Tech students have received 8 Marshall Scholarships and UGA has received 5 ranking 2nd and 6th respectively for most Marshall Scholars among public universities.

Rank by Fulbright scholars

In 2012, University of Georgia and Emory University ranked in the top percentile of doctoral/research institutions producing Fulbright scholars. 38 Fulbright scholars came from Georgian institutions. The Fulbright Program is a program of highly competitive, merit-based grants for international educational exchange for students, scholars, teachers, professionals, scientists and artists, founded by United States Senator J. William Fulbright in 1946.

Rank by Truman Scholars

Since the scholarship was enacted in 1977, 49 Truman Scholars came from a Georgian college or University. The Harry S. Truman Scholarship is a highly competitive and prestigious federal scholarship granted to U.S. college juniors for demonstrated leadership potential and a commitment to public service.

Historically Black Colleges and Universities ranked by academic measures
There are 7 Historically Black Colleges & Universities (HBCUs) in Georgia. Savannah State University, Fort Valley State University and Albany State University are three public HBCUs housed within the University System of Georgia. The other four schools are private schools.

The institutions below are ranked by average SAT score of first-time freshman for the 2012-2013 academic year. A first-time freshman describes a student entering a 4-year college or university for the first time. These figures do not include transfer, duel enrolled, post-baccalaureate or non-traditional students. First-time freshman account for the majority of the student population at a 4-year college or university.

Athletic affiliations of 4-year institutions

  Augusta University's men's and women's golf teams compete at the NCAA Division I level.

Closed schools
Atlanta College of Art in Atlanta (closed in 2006)
Tift College in Forsyth (closed in 1986)
Martin Institute in Jefferson (burned to the ground in 1942)
Southern Catholic College in Dawsonville (closed in 2010)
Laurus Technical Institute Atlanta (closed in 2015)

See also

 List of college athletic programs in Alabama
 Georgia Board of Regents
 University System of Georgia
 Georgia Research Alliance
 HOPE Scholarship
 Southern Association of Colleges and Schools
 Higher education in the United States
 Lists of American institutions of higher education
 List of recognized higher education accreditation organizations

References

External links
Department of Education listing of accredited institutions in Georgia

 
Georgia, List of colleges and universities in
Colleges